The Sjønstå River (known as the Langvasselva in its upper course) is a river in the municipality of Fauske in Nordland county, Norway.  The river is located in the valley between the town of Fauske and the village of Sulitjelma.

Geography
The Sjønstå River is the main river of the Sulitjelma drainage system. The stretch from its source at Langvatnet (Long Lake) to the village of Sjønstå, where it empties into Øvervatnet (Upper Lake) has been developed into the Sjønstå Hydroelectric Power Station. The river has many small tributaries. Norwegian County Road 830 runs parallel to the Sjønstå River. The Sulitjelma Line formerly ran along the river. The drainage system is regulated by many hydroelectric stations.

The river gently flows from Langvatnet, but it has some rapids. The only waterfall is located at contour level , where the river runs through narrow sections with steep hillsides. The river has been seriously affected by pollution. After the Sjønstå power plant was built, large quantities of water flowed from Langvatnet down to Øvervatnet, and this has led to less pollution. The lower part of the river supports salmon and has a permanent population of trout.

Hydroelectricity
There are several hydroelectric power stations on the river operated by Salten Kraftsamband: 
The Sjønstå Hydroelectric Power Station with an installed capacity of 35 MW and an average annual production of 282 GWh
The Lomi Hydroelectric Power Station with an installed capacity of 60 MW and an average annual production of 362 GWh
The Fagerli Hydroelectric Power Station with an installed capacity of 24 MW and an average annual production of 252 GWh
The Daja Hydroelectric Power Station with an installed capacity of 15 MW and an average annual production of 157 GWh

In 2013, a concession was requested from the Norwegian Water Resources and Energy Directorate to build the Sjønstå Falls Hydroelectric Power Station. The installed capacity will be about 2.7 MW. According to the plan, the average annual production will be 7.3 GWh. The development will create a further reduction in water flow on a  stretch of the Sjønstå River.

There are also plans to create the Lappland Hydroelectric Power Station, which, if it is realized, will change the flow of water in the Sjønstå River significantly by drawing large quantities of water from Swedish watercourses into Norway.

References

Fauske
Rivers of Nordland
Rivers of Norway